Weser-Ems-Halle is a multi-purpose hall and arena complex with eight halls including the large Große EWE Arena, the small Kleine EWE Arena, the Kongresshalle and the Halle 3, or Messehalle. It is located in Oldenburg, Germany. The seating capacity of the venue is 6,069, for basketball games (at the Große EWE Arena). The venue can host music concerts, sports events, congresses, and conferences.

See also
Große EWE Arena
Kleine EWE Arena

References

External links

 Official website 

1954 establishments in Germany
Buildings and structures completed in 1954
Indoor arenas in Germany
Basketball venues in Germany
Buildings and structures in Oldenburg (city)
Tourist attractions in Oldenburg (city)
Sports venues in Lower Saxony
Sports venues completed in 1954